Abeille is the name of a community currency started in 2010 in Villeneuve-sur-Lot, France. It is named after the French word for bee. The Abeille program is intended to promote local commerce. The Abeille operates with a fixed exchange rate:  =

Creation and objectives
An initiative of a local NGO, "Agir pour le vivant" (Act for the living), the Abeille is intended to:
Promotion of sustainability: organic food and renewable energy among others 
Strengthening the solidarity: enhancing the human relationship between local shoppers and businesses 
Stimulation of local economy.

Currency issue, exchange and acceptance
Bills of 1, 2, 5, and 10 Abeille are issued. They feature drawings from the painter Jean-Claude Maurel on the obverse, and a photograph of a bee on a flower by the photographer Christian Aymé on the reverse.

To maintain an individual bill's validity, a "scrip" corresponding to 2% of the banknote value must be paid every six months. (This system, called demurrage, is a form of currency circulation tax and was invented by Silvio Gesell.)

See also

BerkShares
Chiemgauer
Occitan

References

Local currencies
Freiwirtschaft
Currencies introduced in 2010